William Jennings Bryan is a bronze sculpture depicting the American politician of the same name by Rudulph Evans, which was installed in the United States Capitol's National Statuary Hall, in Washington, D.C., as part of the National Statuary Hall Collection. The statue was gifted by the U.S. state of Nebraska in 1937.

In 2019, a statue of Standing Bear replaced the statue of Bryan in the Statuary Hall. The Bryan statue was relocated to the Nebraska National Guard Museum in Seward, Nebraska.

See also
 1937 in art

References

External links
 

1937 establishments in Washington, D.C.
1937 sculptures
Bronze sculptures in Nebraska
Buildings and structures in Seward County, Nebraska
Bryan, William Jennings
Monuments and memorials in Nebraska
Relocated buildings and structures in the United States
Sculptures of men in Nebraska
Statues in Nebraska
William Jennings Bryan